ProcDump is a command-line application used for monitoring an application for CPU spikes and creating crash dumps during a spike. The crash dumps can then be used by an administrator or software developer to determine the cause of the spike. ProcDump supports monitoring of hung windows and unhandled exceptions. It can also create dumps based on the values of system performance counters.

Overview
Initially, ProcDump was only available for Microsoft Windows. In November 2018, Microsoft confirmed it is porting Sysinternals tools, including ProcDump and ProcMon, to Linux. The software is open source. It is licensed under MIT License and the source code is available on GitHub.

The Linux version requires Linux kernels version 3.5+ and runs on Red Hat Enterprise Linux / CentOS 7, 
Fedora 26, Mageia 6, Ubuntu 14.04 LTS. It currently does not have full feature parity with the Windows version (e.g. custom performance counters).

Example
Create 5 core dumps 10 seconds apart of the target process with process identifier (pid) == 1234

$ sudo procdump -n 5 -p 1234

See also

WinDbg
Dr. Watson (debugger)
kdump (Linux)
ktrace
Process Explorer

References

External links
 ProcDump - Windows Sysinternals | Microsoft Docs
 GitHub - microsoft/ProcDump-for-Linux: A Linux version of the ProcDump Sysinternals tool

Command-line software
Free software programmed in C
Microsoft free software
Software using the MIT license
Unix programming tools
Windows administration